Madivada is a village in West Godavari district in the state of Andhra Pradesh in India.

Demographics
 India census, Madivada has a population of 6896 of which 3455 are males while 3441 are females. The average sex ratio of Madivada village is 996. The child population is 653, which makes up 9.47% of the total population of the village, with sex ratio 973. In 2011, the literacy rate of Madivada village was 83.73% when compared to 67.02% of Andhra Pradesh.

See also 
 West Godavari district

References 

Villages in West Godavari district